Galasso Galassi (active 1450–1488) was an Italian painter of the early-Renaissance period, active mainly in Ferrara. He also worked for some years in Bologna. He was one of the earliest painters of the School of Ferrara.

References

External links
 A painting by Galasso Galassi

15th-century Italian painters
Painters from Ferrara
Italian Renaissance painters
Quattrocento painters
Italian male painters
15th-century births
Year of death missing